North Pacific Group (NOR PAC), founded in 1948 as North Pacific Lumber Company, headquartered in Portland, Oregon, was a major wholesaler and  distributor of wood products, building materials, steel and agriculture commodities in the United States.

Annual sales exceeded $1.2 billion. The company had 800 employees located in 28 offices and 150 inventory locations in the United States and abroad.

In August 2010, North Pacific announced that it had agreed to sell all of its stock to an unidentified “nationally-recognized private equity firm.”

References

External links
http://www.northpacific.com home page (defunct)

Forest products companies of the United States
Companies based in Portland, Oregon
1948 establishments in Oregon
Privately held companies based in Oregon